Radek Sňozík (born 17 October 1975) is a Czech football goalkeeper. He last played for Bohemians 1905 and captained the team.

Sňozík played most of his Gambrinus liga career for Marila Příbram, where he spent six seasons before moving to Bohemians 1905. A goalkeeper who had been taking penalties since his days in youth football, he scored his first penalty for Bohemians in a 2–1 loss to national league home match against FC Tescoma Zlín in November 2007. He was repeatedly voted as the Fans' Player of the Year at Bohemians 1905.

Bohemians 1905 decided against renewing his contract after their promotion to Gambrinus liga for the 2013–14 season and Sňozík became a free agent.

References

External links
 
 Profile at Bohemians 1905 website

Czech footballers
1975 births
Living people
Czech First League players
Bohemians 1905 players
1. FK Příbram players
Association football goalkeepers